Silvia Terenghi (born 9 September 1957) is a former Italian female middle-distance runner and cross-country runner who competed at individual senior level at the World Athletics Cross Country Championships (1975, 1977).

References

External links
 

1957 births
Living people
Italian female middle-distance runners
Italian female cross country runners
Sportspeople from Monza